Angus MacDonell (ca 1751–1817?) was a soldier and political figure in Upper Canada.

He was born at Sandaig in Inverness-shire Scotland around 1751. He came to North America with General Simon Fraser's 71st Regiment which fought for the British in the American Revolution; MacDonell reached the rank of lieutenant. He appears to have been taken prisoner at Yorktown, Virginia and returned to Britain.

In 1786, he returned to Canada and received a grant of land in Charlottenburgh Township. He represented Glengarry & Prescott in the 3rd Parliament of Upper Canada.

Later, he is believed to have become a fur trader and left the area.

External links
Representatives from Glengarry in the Legislative Assembly of Upper Canada

1751 births
1817 deaths
Highland Light Infantry officers
British Army personnel of the American Revolutionary War
Canadian fur traders
Members of the Legislative Assembly of Upper Canada
People from Argyll and Bute
People from the United Counties of Stormont, Dundas and Glengarry
Scottish emigrants to pre-Confederation Ontario
Immigrants to the Province of Quebec (1763–1791)